Vida escante is the first studio album by American reggaeton singer Nicky Jam. It was released in 2004 on Pina Records. The album contains the hit songs "I'm not your Husband", "Chambonea", Me Estoy Muriendo, (R.K.M & Ken-Y) and "Va Pasando el Tiempo". It sold 2 million copies.

Vida escante: Special Edition is a re-edition of the album, released on July 19, 2005.

Track listing

Vida escante

Vida escante: Special Edition
Disc one
 "I'm Not Your Husband / Tu Marido" 
 "Nos Fuimos" 
 "Vive Contigo"
 "Sacando Chispas" 
 "Pasado" 
 "Chambonea"
 "Siguen Haciendo Ruido" 
 "Adicto" 
 "Va Pasando El Tiempo"
 "Como Tú Me Pisas" 
 "Ya No Me Llamas" 
 "Fiel a Tu Piel" 
 "Me Estoy Muriendo" 
 "Siguen Haciendo Ruido" 
 "Me Voy Pa'l Party" 

Disc two (DVD)
 "Chambonea"
 "Vive Contigo"
 "Me Voy Pa'l Party" 
 "Me Estoy Muriendo" – 
 Bonus material

Charts

References

2004 albums
Nicky Jam albums
Pina Records albums
Albums produced by Luny Tunes
Albums produced by Rafy Mercenario
Albums produced by Nely